İstemi is not a common masculine Turkish given name. In Turkish, "İstemi" means "Conqueror of the Sky".

Real People
 İstemi, the Yabgu (ruler) of the western part of the Göktürks, the Western Turkic Khaganate (Celestial Turks).
 İstemi Betil, a Turkish actor (see Turkish Wikipedia article).

Turkish masculine given names